Pierre Waché is a French Formula One engineer. He is currently the technical director at the Red Bull Racing Formula One team.

Career

Waché earned a doctorate in fluid dynamics from the National Polytechnic Institute of Lorraine, specialising in bio-mechanical engineering. After graduating, he began working in 2001 for the global tire manufacturer Michelin in their Formula One programme, and was an engineer that was responsible for the interaction between tires and track conditions for F1 cars. At the end of 2006, Michelin left Formula One as a tire supplier which resulted in Waché being recruited by BMW Sauber as a performance engineer, working with tyres and suspension.

In 2009, BMW announced that it would leave Formula One which resulted in Waché replacing Loïc Serra as the Head of Vehicle Performance for Sauber. In 2013 he moved to Red Bull Racing and become the chief engineer with a focus on vehicle performance and six months later, he was appointed to succeed Mark Ellis as performance director. In 2018 he took on the role of technical director being responsible for the design and production of the car, second only to Adrian Newey.

References 

Living people
1974 births
Formula One engineers
French motorsport people
Red Bull Racing
Sauber Motorsport